Charles Arizechukwu Igwe  (born 23 August 1958) is a Nigerian professor of soil science and the 15th Vice Chancellor of University of Nigeria, Nsukka. He joined the university in the year 1976 as a soil survey assistant and in 1976 he became an academic staff of the institution. In 2016, Charles was appointed the Deputy Vice-Chancellor (Administration) and re-appointed in 2018.

Early life
Charles was born at Awka, Anambra state on 23 August 1958. Awka is the capital of Anambra State, Nigeria and has an estimated population of about 301, 657 people as of 2006 Nigerian population census. Awka is located at about  East of Lagos, Nigeria in the centre of the densely populated Igbo heartland of South East Nigeria.

Career
Charles Arizechukwu Igwe, a Professor of Soil Science was born at Awka, Anambra State, Nigeria on August 23, 1958. He holds a PhD, M.Sc. and B Agric degrees in Soil Science from University of Nigeria, Nsukka. He also obtained Postgraduate Diploma in Soil Science from Agricultural University, Norway, Ås. He was Head of Department; Associate Dean of Faculty; Dean of Faculty and Directors of Centres at various times. Charles was Visiting Researcher/Professor in Universities located in Germany, Japan, Norway, Italy and France. He is a member, University Governing Council and has supervised Undergraduates, Masters and many PhD students in his discipline. He is an External Examiner and Professorial Assessor in many Nigerian and European Universities.

Professor Igwe's research focuses on the contributions of organic and mineral colloids in stability of tropical soils. He contributed significantly in the knowledge of stability of unstable tropical soils which undergo catastrophic soil erosion with intensive tropical rainfall. In the face of Global Climate Change, he expanded the scope of his research to include the "Carbon sequestration in tropical soils". In his search to unravel inherent soil factors influencing erodibility (K) factor of erosion models, he published some pioneering works on soil colloidal-dispersion. He is author or co-author of many peer-reviewed articles in reputable Journals of Soil/Environmental Sciences.

He is a NORAD Fellow; Fellow of Alexander von Humboldt (AvH) Germany; Regular Associate, International Centre for Theoretical Physics, Trieste, Italy; Fellow, Japanese Society for Promotion of Science; Winner, University of Nigeria Vice-Chancellor's Faculty and University Prizes 1992/93; Listed in Marquis Who's Who in Science and Engineering; and participant in German DAAD/DIES Deans Course 2009.

Honors and recognition
Charles has received several fellowship awards  
Fellow of Alexander von Humboldt (AvH) Germany
Regular Associate, International Centre for Theoretical Physics, Trieste, Italy
Fellow, Japanese Society for Promotion of Science
Winner, University of Nigeria Vice-Chancellor's Faculty and University Prizes 1992/93
Listed in Marquis Who's Who in Science and Engineering; participant in German DAAD/DIES Deans Course 2009

References

1958 births
Living people
People from Awka
Igbo academics
Igbo scientists
Alumni of the University of Nottingham
Nigerian geologists
Soil scientists
Vice-Chancellors of the University of Nigeria